A cruise ship poolside theater is a giant LED display screen, ranging from around 250 to 350 square feet (33 m2). It is complemented with a large, 50,000-80,000 watt sound system. The theater is usually placed facing the main swimming pool of a cruise ship. The theater can be used to display news, sporting events, poolside activities, concerts, and movies.

The poolside theater was  introduced in 2004 on the Caribbean Princess, and was built with or installed on other ships in Princess Cruises's fleet. Princess named their poolside theaters as "Movies Under The Stars", but the theater is used all day.  For the outdoor nighttime movies (weather permitting), cushions and blankets are placed over the deck chairs, and popcorn is provided.  The "Movies Under The Stars" name also refers to the service via cable television in the staterooms at night.

In 2005 Carnival Cruise Lines launched their first ship with a poolside theater, the Carnival Liberty. Carnival named their poolside theaters as "Carnival's Seaside Theater". Since the launch of the Carnival Liberty, every new cruise ship built by Carnival has had the "Carnival Seaside Theater" added. In 2005 and in 2006, Disney Cruise Lines has installed its own poolside theater on its two older ships refurbishments. Costa Cruises also has introduced poolside theaters on its Concordia-class fleet. Royal Caribbean International debuted outdoor movie screens as part of the "Aquatheater" on the Oasis class, and has since been added poolside screens to most of their fleet as part of the "Royal Advantage" revitalization program.

Images

Cruise ships that have a poolside theater

AIDA Cruises 
AIDAluna
AIDAblu
AIDAsol
AIDAmar
AIDAstella

Carnival Cruise Lines
Carnival Freedom
Carnival Liberty
Carnival Splendor
Carnival Valor 
Carnival Victory
Carnival Magic
Carnival Dream
Carnival Triumph
Carnival Sunshine
Carnival Conquest
Carnival Glory
Carnival Breeze
Carnival Pride
Carnival Vista

Costa Cruises
Costa Diadema
Costa Favolosa
Costa Fascinosa
Costa Luminosa
Costa Pacifica
Costa Serena

Disney Cruise Line
Disney Dream
Disney Fantasy
Disney Magic
Disney Wonder

Dream Cruises
Genting Dream

MSC Cruises
MSC Fantasia
MSC Musica
MSC Orchestra
MSC Poesia

Norwegian Cruise Line
Norwegian Epic
Norwegian Escape

P&O Cruises 
Azura

P&O Cruises Australia
Pacific Jewel
Pacific Pearl

Princess Cruise Lines
Caribbean Princess
Coral Princess
Crown Princess
Dawn Princess
Diamond Princess
Emerald Princess
Golden Princess
Grand Princess

Ruby Princess
Royal Princess
Sapphire Princess
Sea Princess
Star Princess

Royal Caribbean International
 Vision Class

 
 Voyager Class
 

 Radiance Class

 Freedom Class

 Oasis Class

 Quantum Class

 
 (Under Construction)

References 

Cinemas and movie theaters